Robert Cameron is a Scottish retired amateur football goalkeeper who made over 130 appearances in the Scottish League for Queen's Park.

References

Scottish footballers
Scottish Football League players
Queen's Park F.C. players
Association football goalkeepers
Year of birth missing
Place of birth missing
Petershill F.C. players